Prabhudas Babulal Bhilawekar is a member of the 13th Maharashtra Legislative Assembly. He represents the Melghat Assembly Constituency. He belongs to the Bharatiya Janata Party.

One of Bhilawekar's election promises was to personally look into issues each of the 425 villages in his constituency faced. It is reported that he had visited 70 of these villages in fulfilment of the same, in a couple of weeks since winning the election. Bhilawekar's appointment in June, 2015, as member State Wildlife Board, has been criticised as a dilution of its pro-environment character.

References

Maharashtra MLAs 2014–2019
Living people
Marathi politicians
Bharatiya Janata Party politicians from Maharashtra
1964 births